Nesiocypraea is a genus of sea snails, marine gastropod mollusks in the family Cypraeidae, the cowries.

Species
Species within the genus Nesiocypraea include:
 Nesiocypraea aenigma Lorenz, 2002
 Nesiocypraea lisetae Kilburn, 1975
 Nesiocypraea midwayensis Azuma & Kurohara, 1967
 Nesiocypraea midwayensis kontiki Lorenz, 2012
 Nesiocypraea midwayensis midwayensis Azuma & Kurohara, 1967
 Nesiocypraea teramachii (Kuroda, 1938)
 Nesiocypraea teramachii neocaledonica Lorenz, 2002
 Nesiocypraea teramachii polyphemus Lorenz, 2002
 Nesiocypraea thachi F. Huber, 2020

 Species brought into synonymy 
 Nesiocypraea axelhuberti Lorenz & Hubert, 2000: synonym of Austrasiatica alexhuberti Lorenz and Huber, 2000
 Nesiocypraea axelhuberti Lorenz & Huber, 2000: synonym of  Austrasiatica alexhuberti (Lorenz & Huber, 2000)
 Nesiocypraea deforgesi Lorenz, 2002: synonym of Austrasiatica deforgesi Lorenz, 2002
 Nesiocypraea hirasei (Roberts, 1913)  synonym of  Austrasiatica hirasei (Roberts, 1913)
 Nesiocypraea langfordi(Kuroda, 1938): synonym of Austrasiatica langfordi (Kuroda, 1938)
 Nesiocypraea maricola Cate, 1976: synonym of  Nesiocypraea lisetae Kilburn, 1975
 Nesiocypraea sakurai Habe, 1970: synonym of  Austrasiatica sakurai (Habe, 1970)
 Nesiocypraea sakuraii (Habe, 1970): synonym of  Austrasiatica sakurai (Habe, 1970)

References

Cypraeidae